The Corporation Tax Act 2009 (c 4) is an Act of the Parliament of the United Kingdom. It restated certain legislation relating to corporation tax, with minor changes that were mainly intended "to clarify existing provisions, make them consistent or bring the law into line with well established practice." The Bill was the work of the Tax Law Rewrite Project team at HM Revenue and Customs.

Sections 1310, 1323, 1324, 1325(2) and (3) and 1328 to 1330 came into force on 26 March 2009.

Section 1329(3) confers a power on the Treasury to bring paragraphs 71 and 99 of Schedule 2, and section 1325(1) so far as relating to those paragraphs, and Part 2 of Schedule 3, and section 1326 so far as relating to that Part of that Schedule, into force by order.

The other provisions of the Act came into force on 1 April 2009.

The amendments, repeals and revocations contained in Schedules 1 and 3 have the same extent as the provisions they amend, repeal or revoke. The other provisions of the Act extend to England and Wales, Scotland and Northern Ireland.

References
Halsbury's Statutes,

External links
The Corporation Tax Act 2009, as amended from the National Archives.
The Corporation Tax Act 2009, as originally enacted from the National Archives.
Explanatory notes to the Corporation Tax Act 2009 prepared by the Tax Law Rewrite project at HMRC.

United Kingdom Acts of Parliament 2009
Tax legislation in the United Kingdom